Route 43 is a highway in western Missouri.  Its northern terminus is at U.S. Route 54 midway between Nevada and Deerfield.  Its southern terminus is at the corner of Missouri (near Southwest City), Arkansas, and Oklahoma where it continues down the Arkansas/Oklahoma state line as both Arkansas Highway 43 and Oklahoma State Highway 20.

Route description

North of Joplin, Route 43 is a relatively straight highway.  It intersects U.S. Route 160 in Barton County west of Lamar.  A few miles south of there it intersects Route 126.  Just north of Joplin, it intersects Route 96.

In Joplin, the highway is known as Main Street and passes through the old historic downtown area.  For a few blocks, it is historic US Route 66 until it reaches Seventh Street (Route 66), where Route 66 goes west.  It joins Business Loop I-44 until it reaches Interstate 44, then joins this road for one exit west, then turns south again.

When Route 43 reaches Seneca (where it has a junction with U.S. Route 60), it comes within a half mile of Oklahoma and stays relatively close to it all the way to the intersection with Route 76 east of Tiff City.  All through this area, the highway becomes more hilly and curvy.  The road serves as the western terminus of Route 90 just before reaching Southwest City.  South of Southwest City, the highway runs less than a mile before reaching the corner of Missouri, Arkansas, and Oklahoma becoming the concurrency of Arkansas Highway 43/Oklahoma State Highway 20.  A stone marker is erected at the corner of the three states.

Major intersections

Related route

Seneca truck route

Route 43 Truck is used to bypass a steep grade on Route 43 just south of Seneca, Missouri. This route is unsigned and concourrs with US 60 Bus.

References

043
Transportation in Barton County, Missouri